Clouded Hills may refer to:

 Clouded Hills, a 1929 historical novel by American writer Elizabeth Moorhead
 The Clouded Hills, a 1980 romance novel by English writer Brenda Jagger
 "Shine forth upon our clouded hills", a reference from the 1804 William Blake poem, "And did those feet in ancient time"

See also
Clouds Hill,  a cottage in the county of Dorset in South West England
Cloudy Hill, a 440m high hill in Tai Po District of northeastern Hong Kong